is a former Japanese football player. His son Ryuhei Oishi is also footballer.

Playing career
Oishi was born in Shizuoka Prefecture on May 25, 1964. After graduating from Kokushikan University, he joined his local club Yamaha Motors (later Júbilo Iwata) in 1987. He played many matches as offensive midfielder and forward. He retired end of 1995 season.

Club statistics

References

External links

1964 births
Living people
Kokushikan University alumni
Association football people from Shizuoka Prefecture
Japanese footballers
Japan Soccer League players
J1 League players
Japan Football League (1992–1998) players
Júbilo Iwata players
Association football midfielders